Antonio Molino Rojo (14 September 1926 – 2 November 2011) was a Spanish film actor who appeared primarily in Spaghetti Westerns in the 1960s and 1970s.

Biography

He made nearly 90 appearances in film between 1955 and 1988 but is probably most recognizable in western cinema for his roles in the Sergio Leone trilogy of Spaghetti Westerns A Fistful of Dollars (1964), For a Few Dollars More (1965), and The Good, the Bad and the Ugly in 1966. He also appeared in the Sergio Leone picture Once Upon a Time in the West in 1968, in 4 Dollars of Revenge (1966), etc.

Rojo did not always play gang members in the westerns; in The Good, the Bad and the Ugly, Rojo portrayed a humane commandant at a Union prisoner-of-war camp whose leg was being eroded by gangrene. In the film he told Angel Eyes (Lee Van Cleef) that he knew he was systematically torturing and robbing the Confederate prisoners, and hoped that before he died, he could amass enough evidence to bring Angel Eyes to trial at a court martial.

Rojo died in Barcelona on 2 November 2011 at aged 85.

Selected filmography

 La trinca del aire (1951)
 Such is Madrid (1953) – Bailarín (uncredited)
 El mensaje (1954)
 El torero (1954) – Hombre con bebé en el aeropuerto (uncredited)
 The Other Life of Captain Contreras (1955) 
 El coyote (1955)
 Mr. Arkadin (1955) – (uncredited)
 Mañana cuando amanezca (1955)
 La chica del barrio (1956) – Chulo en verbena (uncredited)
 We Thieves Are Honourable (1956) – Invitado de la fiesta (uncredited)
 El fenómeno (1956) – Pavlovsky
 El malvado Carabel (1956) – Oficinista (uncredited)
 La ironía del dinero (1957) – (uncredited)
 Maravilla (1957) – Felipe
 Juan Simón's Daughter (1957) – Amigo de Alfonso
 Fulano y Mengano (1957) – Preso
 Trapped in Tangier (1957) – Pérez
 ...Y eligió el infierno (1957)
 Muchachas de azul (1957)
 Aquellos tiempos del cuplé (1958)
 El hincha (1958) – Arquitecto
 La vida por delante (1958) – Agente del autocar
 Gli zitelloni (1958)
 Una muchachita de Valladolid (1958)
 La ragazza di Piazza San Pietro (1958)
 Red Cross Girls (1958) – Periodista (uncredited)
 Ya tenemos coche (1958) – Guardia urbano
 Entierro de un funcionario en primavera (1958) – Novio (uncredited)
 15 bajo la lona (1959)
 Parque de Madrid (1959)
 La novia de Juan Lucero (1959)
 Salto a la gloria (1959)
 Venta de Vargas (1959)
 Azafatas con permiso (1959) – Amigo de Alberto 
 Una gran señora (1959) – Amigo de Willy (uncredited)
 S.O.S., abuelita (1959)
 El Lazarillo de Tormes (1959) – Alguacil (Bailiff)
 Y después del cuplé (1959)
 Juicio final (1960)
 The Showgirl (1960)
 A Ray of Light (1960) – Carlos
 One Step Forward (1960)
 An American in Toledo (1960)
 El príncipe encadenado (1960)
 Sentencia contra una mujer (1960)
 El vagabundo y la estrella (1960)
 The Invincible Gladiator (1961) – Euclante
 Rosa de Lima (1961)
 No dispares contra mí (1961) – Kroback
 La mentira tiene cabellos rojos (1962) – Amigo de Enrique
 La venganza del Zorro (1962) – Rock
 Guns of Darkness (1962) – Revolutionary Officer
 Sabían demasiado (1962)
 Escuela de seductoras (1962) – Mr. Curtis
 Gladiators 7 (1962) – Macrobius
 Due contro tutti (1962) – Smith, Missouri Lieutenant
 Cupido contrabandista (1962)
 Perseo l'invincibile (1963) – Tarpete
 Esa pícara pelirroja (1963) – Fabricante lavadoras suizo #1
 Sandokan the Great (1963) – Tenente Toymby
 Los muertos no perdonan (1963) – Inspector Solandes
 Gibraltar (1964) – Thug
 Bienvenido, padre Murray (1964) – Monty
 A Fistful of Dollars (1964) – Baxter Gunman #2 (uncredited)
 Texas Ranger (1964) – Perkins
 Alféreces provisionales (1964) – Teniente de la Academia (uncredited)
 Saul e David (1964)
 Finger on the Trigger (1965) – Benham
 Aventuras del Oeste (1965) – Dittle
 Five Thousand Dollars on One Ace (1965) – Dingus
 The Hell of Manitoba (1965) – Sam
 That Man in Istanbul (1965) – Barrett
 Man from Canyon City (1965) – Matt
 For a Few Dollars More (1965) – Frisco (Indio's Gang) (uncredited)
 Ringo's Big Night (1966) – (uncredited)
 Seven Guns for the MacGregors (1966) – Sheriff
 Seven Golden Men Strike Again (1966)
 Cuatro dólares de venganza (1966) – Dave Griffith
 Kiss Kiss...Bang Bang (1966) – Texas Millionaire (uncredited)
 Culpable para un delito (1966) – Kleiber
 The Sea Pirate (1966) – Andre Chambles
 For a Few Extra Dollars (1966) – Brian, Confederate Officer
 Five for Revenge (1966) – El Matanza
 The Texican (1966) – Harv 
 The Big Gundown (1966) – Widow's ranchero
 Il grande colpo di Surcouf (1966)
 The Good, the Bad and the Ugly (1966) – Capt. Harper 
 El hombre que mató a Billy el Niño (1967) – Tom MacGregor
 El dedo del destino (1967)
 Operación cabaretera (1967) – Marinero de guardia 2
 15 Scaffolds for a Murderer (1967) – Sheriff
 A Minute to Pray, a Second to Die (1968) – Sein (uncredited)
 Once Upon a Time in the West (1968) – Member of Frank's Gang at Auction (uncredited)
 O.K. Yevtushenko (1968) – Gen. Borodin
 Kill Them All and Come Back Alone (1968) – Sergeant
 Battle of the Commandos (1969) – Pvt. Albert Hank 
 Garringo (1969) – Harriman
 A Bullet for Sandoval (1969)
 Hola... señor Dios (1970) – Revisor / Gaspar
 Veinte pasos para la muerte (1970)
 Manos torpes (1970) – Frank
 La diligencia de los condenados (1970) – Buchanan (uncredited)
 Los buitres cavarán tu fosa (1971) – El Rojo
 Un colt por cuatro cirios (1971) – Farley 
 Lo ammazzò come un cane... ma lui rideva ancora (1972) – Ramson
 Horror Story (1972)
 Now They Call Him Sacramento (1972) – Mr. Cray, Banker
 La redada (1973) – Gino
 La muerte incierta (1973) – Clive Dawson
 My Name Is Nobody (1973) – U.S. Army Officer (uncredited)
 El último viaje (1974) – Harold Shiffel
 Una cuerda al amanecer (1974)
 Las correrías del Vizconde Arnau (1974) – Tonino
 Killing of the Dolls (1975) – Sir Arthur
 Relación matrimonial y otras cosas (1975)
 La isla de las vírgenes ardientes (1977)
 Los violadores del amanecer (1978) – Padre de Rafi
 La ciudad maldita (1978) – Peter
 Inés de Villalonga 1870 (1979) – Sacerdote
 Companys, procés a Catalunya (1979) – Oficial Gestapo
 Estigma (1980) – Jorge
 Virus (1980) – SWAT Leader (uncredited)
 Viaje al más allá (1980) – Sacerdote
 Patrizia (1981) – Sam
 Los violadores (1981) – Encargado del párking (uncredited)
 Sechs Schwedinnen auf Ibiza (1981) – Greta's Boss (uncredited)
 Playa azul (1982) – Marcello Donizetti
 Bacanales romanas (1982) – César
 Catherine Chérie (1982) – Inspector Molina (uncredited)
 Samanka (1982)
 Acosada (1985) – Comisario de Policía
 Más allá de la muerte (1986) – Inspector Castillo
 La diputada (1988) – Político
 Sinatra (1988) – Encargado Bingo (final film role)

Notes

External links
 

1926 births
2011 deaths
Male Spaghetti Western actors
People from the Province of Palencia
Spanish male film actors